Madison Mills is an unincorporated community in Madison Township, Fayette County, Ohio, United States.

History

A large gristmill called Madison Mills was built at the site in 1859. The Madison Mills Post Office was established on December 12, 1866, but was discontinued on May 31, 1942.  The mail service is now sent through the Mount Sterling branch. The community has also been listed on maps as Harrison Mills and Posey.

References 

Unincorporated communities in Fayette County, Ohio
Unincorporated communities in Ohio
Populated places established in 1866
1866 establishments in Ohio